Tetrakis(methylammonium) hexachloroferrate(III) chloride  is a chemical compound with the formula (CH3NH3)4[FeCl6]Cl.

Properties

The compound has the form of hygroscopic orange crystals. The hexachloroferrate(III) anion is a coordination complex centred on an iron atom in the +3 oxidation state that is covalently bound to six chloride atoms arranged octahedrally around it. Interstitial chloride anions are each surrounded by four methylammonium cations, with hydrogen bond-like links between the ammonium cations and the ligands of the hexachloroferrate(III) moieties. Each [(CH3NH3)4Cl]3+ unit balances a [FeCl6]3–, analogous to how hexachloroferrate(III) forms stable compounds with various large triply-cationic atoms and other triply-cationic complexes.

Synthesis

The compound is synthesised by reacting methylammonium chloride, CH3NH3Cl, with anhydrous iron(III) chloride and adding hydrochloric acid with heating.  Crystals of the product, which precipitate as the solvent evaporates, are collected and dried using vacuum desiccation.

Infrared analysis

There is a series of bands from 3129 to 2830 cm−1 that represent stretching modes of the nitrogen–hydrogen bonds. In addition, a distinct peak is found at 2517 cm−1, whereas the corresponding signal for methylammonium chloride is at 2476 cm−1. The 31 cm−1 shift is due to the coordination of an ammonium hydrogen with the hexachloroferrate(III).

Notes

Iron complexes
Chloro complexes
Methylammonium compounds
Chlorometallates